Bloomingdale is an unincorporated community in Clark County, Kentucky, United States. The community is part of the Lexington–Fayette Metropolitan Statistical Area.

References

Unincorporated communities in Clark County, Kentucky
Unincorporated communities in Kentucky
Lexington–Fayette metropolitan area